Taranki is a rural locality (a village) in Frolovskoye Rural Settlement, Permsky District, Perm Krai, Russia. The population was 2 as of 2010. There are 2 streets.

Geography 
Taranki is located 32 km southeast of Perm (the district's administrative centre) by road. Molokovo is the nearest rural locality.

References 

Rural localities in Permsky District